The 2018–19 FAO Women's League was the 6th edition of the FAO Women's League. Rising Student's Club were the defending champions. The FAO Women's League (FWL) is organised every year by the Football Association of Odisha (FAO), the official football governing body of Odisha, India. The regular season started on 20 February 2019 and ended on 9 March 2019.

Teams
Bidanasi Club
Odisha Police
Odisha Sports
Rising Student's Club
SAI-STC Cuttack

Venues

Bhubaneswar
 Kalinga Stadium

Cuttack
 Barabati Stadium
 Odisha Police Ground
 Satyabrata Stadium
 Shatabdi Vihar Football Ground

League stage

 Note: The winner of the league stage would qualify for the 2018–19 Indian Women's League season.

Matches

Statistics

Top scorers

Hat-tricks

References

Sports competitions in Odisha
1
2018–19 domestic women's association football leagues